Turchi is an Italian surname. Notable people with the surname include:

Adeodato Turchi (1724-1803), Italian bishop of Parma and writer
Alessandro Turchi (1578–1649), Italian Baroque painter
Celina Turchi, Brazilian epidemiologist
Dolores Turchi (born 1935), Italian writer
Egidio Turchi (born 1913), Italian footballer
Francesco Turchi (16th-century), Italian scholar, Carmelite priest from Treviso.
Giorgio Turchi (born 1931), Italian footballer
Giuseppe Turchi (1759–1799), Italian painter
Giuseppe Turchi (1840-1895), Italian painter
Guido Turchi (1916–2010), Italian classical composer
Manuel Turchi (born 1981), Italian footballer

Italian-language surnames
Ethnonymic surnames